Panthea guatemala is a moth of the family Noctuidae. It has been collected in the mountains of Guatemala and the states of Oaxaca and Chiapas in adjacent southern Mexico at elevations of 1580–1850 m.

External links
Revision of the New World Panthea Hübner (Lepidoptera, Noctuidae) with descriptions of 5 new species and 2 new subspecies

Pantheinae
Moths described in 2009